Riola is a municipality in the comarca of Ribera Baixa in the Valencian Community, Spain.

References

External links
 

Municipalities in the Province of Valencia
Ribera Baixa